Khargone is a city and administrative headquarters of an Khargone district in the Indian state of Madhya Pradesh. The city is located on the bank of the Kunda river and is known for its cotton and chilly (chili pepper) production. It is also known for Navgraha Mandir, a temple devoted to the nav grahas (nine planets). Khargone topped the nation in municipality and received a national award for 'India's Fastest Moving City' under a population of two lakh. Khargone ranked 10th Cleanest city in India in Swachh Survekshan 2020 City ranked the 15th cleanest city in India in Swachh Survekshan 2018 and ranked 17th cleanest city in India in Swachh Survekshan 2017.

History
According to mythology, the name "Nimar" was derived from the word "Nimarya" (निमार्य), which signifies that the land had belonged to both the Aryas and the non-Arya. However, according to another myth, the word "Nimar" has been associated with the place due to the presence of many Neem trees.

At different times in history, the area was ruled by the Kingdoms of Haihayas (हैहय) of Maheshwar, Parmar of Malwa, Ahirs of Asirgarh, Muslims of Mandav, Mughals and Marathas. After the formation of the state of Madhya Pradesh on 1 November 1956, the district came into existence as West Nimar (पश्चिम निमाड़). Later (on 25 May 1998) due to certain administrative needs, the district was divided between Khargone and Barwani.
The population of the district was estimated to be about 1,872,413, according to the census of India 2011.

Tourism 
Here the very ancient Shri Navagraha Temple is situated on the banks of the Kunda river, due to which the city is known as Navgrah ki Nagri (City of Navagraha),

Near 17 Kilometer, Oon is a very old village in which are 99 Bhumija-style temples built by emperor Ballaleshwar. Oon has a MahaLakshmi and Jain temple.

Jain temples 

Chaubara Dera 2 and Gwaleshwar temple are two 12th century Jain temples built in Western Chalukya architecture. 
Chaubara Dera 2 houses three inscriptions dated 1170 CE, 1185 CE and 1165 CE. Gwaleshwar temple or popularly known as Pavagiri is an ancient Jain temple. The name, Gwaleshwar temple, is derived from the fact the Jain monks used to take shelter in the temple during storms. This temple is a siddh kshetra, believed to be place of nirvana for many Jain monks. The mulnayak of the temple is seated on triratha pedestal bearing a 13th century inscription.

Geography
Towards the north it borders Dhar, Indore and Dewas districts. Towards the south, it borders Maharashtra, in the east, Khandwa&Mundi and Burhanpur and Barwani in the west. Khargone is in the middle of the Narmada River valley with the Vindhyachal mountain range situated in the north and Satpura in the south. The River Narmada flows along a path of  inside the district. Veda and Kunda are the other two main rivers in the district.

Demographics

Khargone is growing fast as a city, and it now includes many flourishing villages.  India census, Khargone had a population of 1,16,150. While males constitute 51.44% of the population, females average 49.46%.  Khargone has an average literacy rate of 80.9%. This is higher than the national average of 74.04%: male literacy is 87.84%, and female literacy is 75.73%. About 13% of the population is under 6 years of age.

Climate
Khargone has a transitional climate between a tropical wet and dry climate and a humid subtropical climate. Three distinct seasons are observed: summer, monsoon and winter.
Summers are extremely hot and dry in this region, lasting from mid-march to mid-June followed by the monsoon season. The temperatures in summer are usually above  during April–May. During these months when temperatures become very high, the dry and hot wind (locally known as "loo") blows in this area, widely affecting the local ecology. The temperature also remains quite high during the night.

The rainy season is humid and has substantial rainfall. Local people are commonly affected by the flooding of river Kunda, which flows from the outskirts of the city.
Winters start in mid-November and are dry, mild and sunny. Temperatures average about 4–15 °C , but can fall close to freezing on some nights.

Education

Colleges
There are various colleges in the district. These are affiliated with Devi Ahilya Vishwavidyalay, Indore (University of Indore) and offer several graduate and postgraduate-level courses. The list includes:

 Nimar Institute of Information Technology and Science (NIITS), Khargone
 Shree Narayan Institute of Technology (SNIT)
 Jawaharlal Nehru Mahavidyalaya
 Jawaharlal Institute of Technology, Borawan
 Government Post Graduate Degree College
 Government Girls Degree College
 Shreeji Institute Of Technology and Management College 
 Alma Computer Khargone
 Saikripa Academy Khargone
 Devi Rukmini college of Education
 Modak Institute of technology
 Vikalp Krishi Shikshan Sansthan (Institute of Agriculture), Khargone.

Schools
There are various schools. These are affiliated with CBSE.The list includes:
St. Jude's higher secondary school,Khargone
Aaditya vidya vihar higher secondary school, khargone
Devi Rukmani Higher Secondary School, Khargone
Gokuldas Public School
Kendriya Vidyalaya Khargone
Maharishi Vidya Mandir
Creative Public School.
There are also Board of Secondary Education, Madhya Pradesh affiliated schools in Khargone as:
 Saraswati Shishu/Vidya Mandir
 Bal Shiksha Niketan
 Priyadarshini higher secondary school
 Gayatri Shiksha Niketan
 D.A.G.H.S.S. No.1 (utkrisht school)
 D.A.G.H.S.S. No.2 (school of excellence)
 Govt. higher secondary school no.7 (Motipura).

References

Citation

Source

External links

 Official Website of Khargone District
 Shri Mahalaxmi Oon Khargone

 
Cities and towns in Khargone district
12th-century Jain temples
Cities in Madhya Pradesh